Ludwik Raczyński (born 2 May 1943) is a Polish sailor. He competed at the 1968 Summer Olympics and the 1980 Summer Olympics.

References

External links
 

1943 births
Living people
Polish male sailors (sport)
Olympic sailors of Poland
Sailors at the 1968 Summer Olympics – Flying Dutchman
Sailors at the 1980 Summer Olympics – Flying Dutchman
Sportspeople from Warsaw